Nephele monostigma is a moth of the family Sphingidae. It is known from highland forests in the Cameroon, Uganda and Kenya.

References

Nephele (moth)
Moths described in 1925
Moths of Africa
Taxa named by Benjamin Preston Clark